Eqbaliyeh is a city in Qazvin Province, Iran.

Eqbaliyeh may also refer to:
 Eqbaliyeh, Alborz
 Eqbaliyeh, Razavi Khorasan
 Eqbaliyeh, Nishapur, Razavi Khorasan Province